GRB 790305b is an event that took place on 5 March 1979. It was an extremely bright burst that was successfully localized to supernova remnant N49 in the Large Magellanic Cloud. This event is now interpreted as a magnetar giant flare, more related to SGR flares than "true" gamma-ray bursts. It is the first observed SGR megaflare, a specific type of short GRB. It has been associated with the magnetar PSR B0525-66.

The event
On 5 March 1979, Soviet spacecraft Venera 11 and Venera 12, then drifting through the Solar System, were hit by a blast of gamma radiation at approximately 10:51 EST. This contact raised the radiation readings on both the probes from a normal 100 counts per second to over 200,000 counts a second, in only a fraction of a millisecond.

This burst of gamma rays quickly continued to spread. Eleven seconds later, Helios 2, a NASA probe, which was in orbit around the Sun, was saturated by the blast of radiation. It soon hit Venus, and the Pioneer Venus Orbiter's detectors were overcome by the wave. Seconds later, Earth received the wave of radiation, where the powerful output of gamma rays inundated the detectors of three U.S. Department of Defense Vela satellites, the Soviet Prognoz 7 satellite, and the Einstein Observatory. Just before the wave exited the Solar System, the blast also hit the International Sun-Earth Explorer. This extremely powerful blast of gamma radiation constituted the strongest wave of extra-solar gamma rays ever detected; it was over 100 times more intense than any known previous extra-solar burst. Because gamma rays travel at the speed of light and the time of the pulse was recorded by several distant spacecraft as well as on Earth, the source of the gamma radiation could be calculated to an accuracy of about 2 arcseconds. The direction of the source corresponded with the remnants of a star that had gone supernova around 3000 B.C.E. It was in the Large Magellanic Cloud and the source was named SGR 0525-66, the event itself was named GRB 790305b, the first observed SGR megaflare.

References

19790305
Dorado (constellation)
Large Magellanic Cloud
19790305
March 1979 events